The Russian Men's Volleyball Supercup is a volleyball competition between the champion of Russia and the winner of the Cup of Russia . The first edition of the Russian Volleyball Supercup was held in the 2008/09 season.

List of champions

Winners by club

References

External links
 Всероссийская федерация волейбола